Mars Callahan (born as Gregory Mars Martin, December 1, 1971) is an American actor, film director, producer and writer.

He is perhaps best known for the film Poolhall Junkies where he served as director, actor and screenwriter.

Career 
At the age of eleven, Callahan toured with a children's musical group through thirty-seven states.  At fifteen he received his first acting role in the television series The Wonder Years.  After honing his acting skills in television he tried for the big screen and soon appeared in various films.  Inspired by the directors he worked with Callahan decided to try working behind the camera and in 1998 shot his first short film The Red Bag.

Big Sky Motion Pictures was founded in Los Angeles as a film production company by Mars Callahan and executive producer Rand Chortkoff.

In a 2007 interview with The Hollywood Reporter, Callahan revealed that he has had serious health problems when doctors found a tumor in his right kidney.  He lost his right kidney and right adrenal gland, and has been in and out of a wheelchair for years.

Callahan cashed in 94th place in the 2011 World Series of Poker main event, earning $64,531.

Selected filmography 
 1986: The Children of Times Square
 1992: Highway to Hell
 1993: Kalifornia
 1994: Clifford
 1996: That Thing You Do!
 2001: Double Down
 2002: Poolhall Junkies
 2007: What Love Is
 2016: Four Kings
 Unreleased: Spring Break '83

References

External links

1971 births
Living people
American male film actors
American male screenwriters
American male television actors
Film producers from California
Male actors from Los Angeles
Writers from Los Angeles
People from Studio City, Los Angeles
Film directors from Los Angeles
Screenwriters from California